Angelina Rodriguez (born May 31, 1968) is an American woman from Montebello, California who was sentenced to death for the September 2000 murder of Jose Francisco "Frank" Rodriguez, her fourth husband. She also was accused of killing her infant daughter in 1993 by suffocating her with a pacifier. Rodriguez is incarcerated at the Central California Women's Facility in Chowchilla, California, where she is on death row awaiting execution.

Background
Rodriguez met her husband Frank, a special education teacher, while they were employed at a camp in San Luis Obispo, California. The couple married in April 2000. It was her fourth marriage. Prosecutors argue that within months of the marriage, Rodriguez took out a $250,000 (2018 value of $366,000) life insurance policy on Frank and began plotting to kill him. She was suspected of poisoning Frank's tea with oleander leaves, loosening the gas cap on their clothes dryer, and finally adding antifreeze to her husband's Gatorade. Frank Rodriguez died on September 9, 2000. His death was initially ruled undetermined, but the lack of a cause of death meant that Rodriguez could not get a death certificate or Frank's life insurance. She pushed for more testing, and these results showed that he intentionally had been poisoned. Rodriguez was arrested for murder in Paso Robles, California in February 2001.

Trial
Three years after Frank's death, Rodriguez's murder trial began in the fall of 2003. During the years since her arrest, prosecutors discovered that her 13-month-old daughter Alicia died suspiciously in 1993. Rodriguez claimed that her daughter choked on a pacifier that became dislodged, but investigators believe that Rodriguez removed the pacifier's nipple and used it to suffocate Alicia. Rodriguez then sued the pacifier manufacturer and was awarded a settlement of $700,000. After Alicia's death was ruled accidental, she also received a $50,000 life insurance policy. Although she never was charged with her daughter's death, this evidence was presented at her trial to show that Rodriguez's motive for the murder was financial.

In October 2003, Rodriguez was convicted of first-degree murder with special circumstances, murder for financial gain, and attempt to dissuade a witness. She was not convicted of the charge of soliciting murder. The following month, the jury rendered a sentence of death.

Rodriguez was sentenced to death by lethal injection on January 12, 2004. In her sentencing, Los Angeles County Superior Court Judge William R. Pounders stated that she killed her husband in an "exceptionally cruel and callous" way and that her guilt had been proved to be "an absolute certainty...In the past 20 years, I have never seen a colder heart." Despite her conviction and death sentence, Rodriguez argued her innocence and maintained that her husband's death was a suicide by antifreeze poisoning.

Aftermath
Rodriguez was awarded a new sentencing hearing in 2010 but was re-sentenced to death in November 2010. Her most recent appeal was denied by the Supreme Court of California in February 2014. Rodriguez remains on death row at the Central California Women's Facility in Chowchilla, California. However, she is planning to appeal her case to the United States Supreme Court.

Media
The murder of Frank Rodriguez has been profiled on several television shows, including North Mission Road on truTV, Deadly Women and Happily Never After on Investigation Discovery, Snapped on the Oxygen Network, and It Takes a Killer on Escape TV. The crime was featured on an episode of NBC's Dateline, titled "The Devil in Disguise".

Published in February 2016, the book A Taste for Murder, written by Burl Barer and Frank C. Girardot, covers the details of the crimes committed by Rodriguez.

See also 
The articles listed are based on women who committed murders for financial gain, the noted years are the span of the killing(s).

 Black Widow Murders, 1999-2005
 Teresa Lewis, 2002
 Celeste Beard, 1999
 Frances Elaine Newton, 1987
 Stella Maudine Nickell, 1986
 Judy Buenoano, 1971-1983
 Janie Lou Gibbs, 1966–1967
 Ruth Snyder, 1927
 Belle Gunness, 1900-1908
 Black Widows of Liverpool, 1880–1883

References

External links
Supreme Court of California case and opinions hosted at FindLaw, February 20, 2014
Los Angeles County District Attorney's Office Press Release, Jury Recommends Death Sentence for Woman Convicted of Poisoning Her Husband, November 12, 2003

1968 births
2000 murders in the United States
American female murderers
American people convicted of murder
American prisoners sentenced to death
Prisoners sentenced to death by California
Living people
People convicted of murder by California
People from Montebello, California
Mariticides
20th-century American criminals
Women sentenced to death
Murderers for life insurance money